The Victorian Aboriginal Heritage Register (VAHR), is a list of all known Aboriginal cultural heritage places in Victoria, Australia. It was established by and is regulated under the Aboriginal Heritage Act 2006. The Register is administered by the Office of Aboriginal Affairs Victoria, in some instances through delegation to Registered Aboriginal Parties.

The VAHR evolved from the original Archaeological and Aboriginal Relics Office, established by the Archaeological and Aboriginal Relics Preservation Act 1972.

 it included approximately 35,000 archaeological sites, historic Aboriginal places and Aboriginal cultural artefacts.

See also
Aboriginal Victorians

References

External links

Heritage registers in Australia
History of Victoria (Australia)
Government research
Archaeological sites in Victoria (Australia)
Australian Aboriginal culture